Kolli may refer to:
 Kolli, Iran (disambiguation), places in Iran
 Kolli Hills, is a small mountain range located in central Tamil Nadu
 Kolli Pratyagatma, better known as Kotayya Pratyagatma
 Kolli Srinath Reddy better known as K. Srinath Reddy, is the president of the Public Health Foundation of India

See also 

 Koli (disambiguation)